Victor Berthy (31 January 1904 – 27 February 1989) was a French racing cyclist. He rode in the 1927 Tour de France.

References

1904 births
1989 deaths
French male cyclists
Place of birth missing